The Everyman Cinema, Muswell Hill, formerly The Odeon, is a grade II* listed building with Historic England. It was designed by George Coles.

Gallery

References

External links

Grade II* listed buildings in the London Borough of Haringey
Muswell Hill
Cinemas in London